Fear of the Dark is the ninth studio album released by English heavy metal band Iron Maiden. Released on 11 May 1992, it was their third studio release to top the UK Albums Chart, and the last to feature Bruce Dickinson as the group's lead vocalist until his return in 1999.

It was also the first album to be produced by bassist and band founder Steve Harris, and the last album to feature the work of producer Martin Birch, who retired after its release.

History
After recording its predecessor (1990's No Prayer for the Dying) in a barn on Steve Harris' property with the Rolling Stones Mobile Studio, leading to negative results, for this album Harris had the building converted into a proper studio (christened "Barnyard"). Bruce Dickinson describes the results as "a slight improvement because Martin [Birch] came in and supervised the sound. But there were big limitations on that studio – simply because of its physical size, things like that. [It] actually ended up not too bad, but, you know, a little bit under par."

At 57 minutes and 58 seconds in length, Fear of the Dark was Iron Maiden's first double studio LP, as well as the longest album from Dickinson's first tenure in the band.

The album's musical style showed some experimentation with "Be Quick or Be Dead", a fast tempo song in a heavier thrash style released as the album's first single, and "Wasting Love", the group's first power ballad, which dates back to Dickinson's first solo album, Tattooed Millionaire. Both songs were Dickinson/Gers collaborations, which contrasted with Harris' "Afraid to Shoot Strangers", a political song from the point of view of a soldier in the Gulf War, Dickinson would often introduce the song as an anti-war narrative. "Fear is the Key" is about the fear in sexual relationships resulting from AIDS. The song was written around the time when the band learned about the death of Queen singer Freddie Mercury. Dickinson affirmed: "There's a line in 'Fear Is the Key' that goes: "nobody cares 'til somebody famous dies". And that's quite sadly true. [...] As long as the virus was confined to homosexuals or drug-addicts, nobody gave a shit. It's only when celebrities started to die that the masses began to feel concerned". "Weekend Warrior" is about football hooliganism.

Only two of the album's songs, the title track and "Afraid to Shoot Strangers", would survive on tours following 1993. "Fear of the Dark" has been on the set list of every subsequent tour except 2005, in which the band only played songs from their first 4 albums. ”Fear of the Dark” and “Afraid to Shoot Strangers” were the only songs played on the Somewhere Back in Time World Tour and the Maiden England World Tour which were not from the 1980s. "Afraid to Shoot Strangers" became a frequent addition on setlists during Blaze Bayley's tenure with Iron Maiden, following which it returned in 2012.

"Be Quick or Be Dead", "From Here to Eternity" and "Wasting Love" were released as singles.

Guitarist Gordon Giltrap released an album of the same title in 1978. Nicko McBrain was earlier a member of Giltrap's band and played on his 1973 album Giltrap. The Gordon Giltrap logo also uses a font resembling Iron Maiden's logo.

Fear of the Dark Tour was the tour supporting the album.

Album cover
According to the band's biographer, Mick Wall, the Fear of the Dark album cover depicts their mascot, Eddie, "as some sort of Nosferatu tree figure leering at the moon". It was the group's first not to be designed by artist Derek Riggs, whose contributions were rejected in favour of Melvyn Grant's. According to Iron Maiden's manager, Rod Smallwood, the band began accepting contributions from other artists as "We wanted to upgrade Eddie for the 90s. We wanted to take him from the sort of comic-book horror creature and turn him into something a bit more straightforward so that he became even more threatening." Following Fear of the Dark, Grant has produced several more covers for Iron Maiden, making him the band's second most-frequent artist after Riggs.

Reception

Reviews for the album were mixed, with AllMusic commenting that, while "easily an improvement over 1990's lackluster No Prayer for the Dying (both musically and sonically)", the release "still wasn't quite on par with their exceptional work from the '80s". Sputnikmusic were more positive about the release, stating that "though many of the songs are still sub-par by their standards ... the band returns to the lofty heights that they enjoyed for the entirety of the 80's". Billboard gave it a positive review on release, saying Dickinson's voice "shows no sign of wear and tear" and the guitar work "sounds fresh and crisp".

In October 2011, Fear of the Dark was ranked No. 8 on Guitar World magazine's top ten list of guitar albums of 1992.

Fear of the Dark became the third Iron Maiden album to top the UK Albums Chart. It is the band's most successful record in North America after the inception of Nielsen SoundScan in 1991, with 438,000 copies sold as of 2008.

Track listing

 "Space Station No. 5" contains a hidden track titled "Bayswater Ain't a Bad Place to Be", which was previously released as a hidden track on the UK edition of the "Be Quick or Be Dead" single.

Personnel
Production and performance credits are adapted from the album liner notes.

Iron Maiden
Bruce Dickinson – vocals
Dave Murray – guitars
Janick Gers – guitars
Steve Harris – bass
Nicko McBrain – drums

Additional musicians
Michael Kenney – keyboards

Production
Martin "The Juggler" Birch – production, engineering, mixing
Steve Harris – co-production, mixing
Mick McKenna – assistant engineering
Melvyn Grant – sleeve illustration
George Chin – photography
Phil Anstice – photography
Rod Smallwood – management
Andy Taylor – management
Hugh Gilmour – art direction, design (1998 edition)
Harry Mohan – management

Charts

Weekly charts

Certifications

References

1992 albums
Iron Maiden albums
EMI Records albums
Albums produced by Martin Birch
Albums recorded in a home studio